Sur Lípez or Sud Lípez is a province in the Potosí Department in Bolivia. The seat of the province is San Pablo de Lípez.

Location
Sur Lípez is one of sixteen provinces in the Potosí Department. Also the southwesternmost point of Bolivia is located here, at 22° 49' 41.016" South, 67° 52' 35.004" West, at an elevation of approximately 5,400 m on the northeastern slope of the Licancabur volcano.

It is bordered by the Nor Lípez Province in the north and northwest, Enrique Baldivieso Province in the west, the Republic of Chile in the southwest and south, the Republic of Argentina in the southeast and east, and Sud Chichas Province in the northeast.

The province extends from the northeast to the southwest, at a length of 230 km and an average width of 100 km.

Geography
In its southwestern part, the Quetena Grande Canton which lies in the Eduardo Avaroa Andean Fauna National Reserve, the province has a couple of lakes and salt pans, the largest being Laguna Colorada, which is 10 km in diameter at an elevation of 4,278 m. Other lakes, such as Laguna Verde, Laguna Blanca and Laguna Celeste are also well known for their respectively green, white and blue colors. There is a geyser field called "Sol de Mañana" in south-western Sur Lípez.

The Cordillera de Lípez traverses the province. Other mountains are listed below:

The tourist circuit La Ruta de las Joyas Altoandinas passes through the spectacular geography of this area.

Division
The province comprises three municipalities which are further subdivided into cantons.

Population
The population increased from 4,158 (1992 census) to 4,905 inhabitants (2001 census), an increase of 18%.

99.4% of the population have no access to electricity, 90% have no sanitary facilities. 69% of the population are employed in agriculture, 4% in mining, 4% in industry, 23% in general services. 86% of the population are Catholics, 9% Protestants.

The people are predominantly indigenous citizens of Quechua descent.

Languages 
The languages spoken in the province are mainly Spanish and Quechua.

See also 

 Árbol de Piedra
 Coruto Lake or Caruta Lake
 Laguna Hedionda
 Laguna Honda
 Kalina Lake
 Luru Mayu Lake
 Wilama
Sapaliri

References

External links
Population data (Spanish)
Panoramic pictures of the province

Provinces of Potosí Department